The Global Burden of Disease Study (GBD) is a comprehensive regional and global research program of disease burden that assesses mortality and disability from major diseases, injuries, and risk factors. GBD is a collaboration of over 3600 researchers from 145 countries. Under principal investigator Christopher J.L. Murray, GBD is based out of the Institute for Health Metrics and Evaluation (IHME) at the University of Washington and funded by the Bill and Melinda Gates Foundation.

History
The Global Burden of Disease Study began in 1990 as a single World Bank-commissioned study that quantified the health effects of more than 100 diseases and injuries for eight regions of the world, giving estimates of morbidity and mortality by age, sex, and region. It also introduced the disability-adjusted life year (DALY) as a new metric to quantify the burden of diseases, injuries, and risk factors, to aid comparisons. GBD 1990 was "institutionalized" at the World Health Organization (WHO) and the research was "conducted mainly by researchers at Harvard and WHO".

In 2000–2002, the 1990 study was updated by WHO to include a more extensive analysis using a framework known as comparative risk factor assessment.

The WHO estimates were again updated for 2004 in The global burden of disease: 2004 update (published in 2008) and in Global health risks (published in 2009).

Official DALY estimates had not been updated by WHO since 2004 until the Global Burden of Diseases, Injuries, and Risk Factors Study 2010 (GBD 2010), also known as the Global Burden of Disease Study 2010, was published in December 2012. The work quantified the burdens of 291 major causes of death and disability and 67 risk factors disaggregated by 21 geographic regions and various age–sex groups. GBD 2010 had the Institute for Health Metrics and Evaluation as its coordinating center, but was a collaboration between several institutions including WHO and the Harvard School of Public Health. The work was funded by the Gates Foundation. The GBD 2010 estimates contributed to WHO's own estimates published in 2013, although WHO did not acknowledge the GBD 2010 estimates.

The Global Burden of Disease Study 2013 (GBD 2013) was published in 2014. The first installment, "Smoking Prevalence and Cigarette Consumption in 187 Countries, 1980–2012", was published in the Journal of the American Medical Association in January, and further installments were published throughout the year. IHME continued to act as the coordinating center for the work.

The Global Burden of Disease Study 2017 (GBD 2017) was published in October 2018. The work was still coordinated at IHME. The life of Christopher Murray and the Global Burden of Disease Study is told in Epic Measures: One Doctor. Seven Billion Patients by Jeremey N. Smith.

GBD 2019 was published in The Lancet in October 2020.

Growth
The following table summarizes GBD's growth over the years.

Aims
The GBD has three specific aims:

 To systematically incorporate information on non-fatal outcomes into the assessment of the health status (using a time-based measure of healthy years of life lost due either to premature mortality or to years lived with a disability, weighted by the severity of that disability)
 To ensure that all estimates and projections were derived on the basis of objective epidemiological and demographic methods, which were not influenced by advocates.
 To measure the burden of disease using a metric that could also be used to assess the cost-effectiveness of interventions. The metric chosen was the DALY.

The burden of disease can be viewed as the gap between current health status and an ideal situation in which everyone lives into old age free of disease and disability. Causes of the gap are premature mortality, disability and exposure to certain risk factors that contribute to illness.

Results
The 2013 report showed that global life expectancy for both sexes increased from 65.3 years in 1990, to 71.5 years in 2013, while the number of deaths increased from 47.5 million to 54.9 million over the same interval. Progress varied widely across demographic and national groups. Reductions in age-standardised death rates for cardiovascular diseases and cancers in high-income regions, and reductions in child deaths from diarrhoea, lower respiratory infections and neonatal causes in low-income regions drove the changes. HIV/AIDS reduced life expectancy in southern sub-Saharan Africa.

For most communicable causes of death both numbers of deaths and age-standardised death rates fell, while for most non-communicable causes, demographic shifts increased numbers of deaths but decreased age-standardised death rates.

Global deaths from injury increased by 10.7%, from 4.3 million deaths in 1990 to 4.8 million in 2013; but age-standardised rates declined over the same period by 21%. For some causes of more than 100,000 deaths per year in 2013, age-standardised death rates increased between 1990 and 2013, including HIV/AIDS, pancreatic cancer, atrial fibrillation and flutter, drug use disorders, diabetes, chronic kidney disease and sickle-cell anaemias. Diarrhoeal diseases, lower respiratory infections, neonatal causes and malaria remain in the top five causes of death in children younger than 5 years. The most important pathogens are rotavirus for diarrhoea and pneumococcus for lower respiratory infections.

GBD 2015 found that for the first time, annual deaths from measles had fallen below 100,000 in 2013 and 2015. It also found that the global annual rate of new HIV infections has largely stayed the same during the past 10 years.

GBD 2015 also introduced the Socio-demographic Index (SDI) as a measure of a location's socio-demographic development that takes into account average income per person, educational attainment, and total fertility rate.

Reception

The results of the Global Burden of Disease Study have been cited by The New York Times, The Washington Post, Vox, and The Atlantic.

The World Health Organization did not acknowledge the GBD 2010 estimates.

Publications
The following is a table of GBD publications .

"GBD 2010" proper means the paper was published as part of the original triple issue in The Lancet.

See also 
 Alan Lopez
 Dan Wikler
 Disease Control Priorities Project
 Dean Jamison
 Health policy
 Pharmacoeconomics
 Priority-setting in global health

References

External links
 GBD project page on the IHME website
 Global Burden of Disease Study page on The Lancet website
 Global burden of disease at WHO website
 GBD Publications from Harvard School of Public Health
 Global Burden of Disease Mental Disorders and Illicit Drug Use Expert Group at National Drug and Alcohol Research Centre (University of New South Wales, Australia)

International medical and health organizations
Public health research